These are the number-one singles of 1967 according to the Top 100 Singles chart in Cash Box magazine.

See also 
1967 in music
List of Hot 100 number-one singles of 1967 (U.S.)

References
http://members.aol.com/_ht_a/randypny2/cashbox/1967.html
https://web.archive.org/web/20111002051927/http://www.cashboxmagazine.com/archives/60s_files/1967.html
http://musicseek.info/no1hits/1967.htm

1967
1967 record charts
1967 in American music